Rauvolfia tetraphylla is a plant in the family Apocynaceae, growing as a bush or small tree. It is commonly known as the be still tree or devil-pepper. The plant is native to Mexico, Central America, West Indies, and northern South America. It has been cultivated widely as both an ornamental and for use in traditional medicine.  It is now naturalized throughout the tropics including Australasia, Indochina, and India.

Rauvolfia tetraphylla fruits are called devil-peppers and hold an important position in the Indian traditional system of medicine. The plant has various significances and it is widely used by South Indian tribes.

Asima Chatterjee initiated chemical investigation of alkaloids in Rauvolfia tetraphylla then known as Rauwolfia canescens. Indole alkaloids including serpentine, reserpine, serpentinine, and other Rauwolfia alkaloids were identified in phytochemical study.

References

External links

tetraphylla
Quinine
Plants described in 1753
Taxa named by Carl Linnaeus
Flora of Mexico
Flora of Central America
Flora of South America
Flora of the Caribbean
Medicinal plants
Flora without expected TNC conservation status